Cafetite is a rare titanium oxide mineral with formula ·.  It is named for its composition, Ca-Fe-Ti.

It was first described in 1959 for an occurrence in the Afrikanda Massif, Afrikanda, Kola Peninsula, Murmanskaja Oblast, Northern Region, Russia. It is also reported from the Khibiny and Kovdor massifs of the Kola Peninsula and from Meagher County, Montana, US.

It occurs in pegmatites in a pyroxenite intrusion as crystals in miarolitic cavities. It occurs associated with ilmenite, titaniferous magnetite, titanite, anatase, perovskite, baddeleyite, phlogopite, clinochlore and kassite.

References 

Oxide minerals
Titanium minerals
Monoclinic minerals
Minerals in space group 14